Giovanni Battista Costa was an Italian painter, active in Milan about 1670. 

The churches of San Agostino, San Giovanni and San Eustorgio in Milan each have a painting by him.

References

Sources 
 Martin, Andrew John (2021). "Costa, Giovanni Battista (1670)". In Beyer, Andreas; Savoy, Bénédicte; Tegethoff, Wolf (eds.). Allgemeines Künstlerlexikon - Internationale Künstlerdatenbank - Online. K. G. Saur. Retrieved 7 October 2022.
 "Costa, Giovanni Battista". Benezit Dictionary of Artists. 2011. Oxford Art Online. Retrieved 7 October 2022.

17th-century Italian painters